The 2015 Dongyin explosion was an explosion that occurred at the Diao Kou Xiang Bin Yuan Chemical Co. located within the Dongying Economic Development Zone in Dongying, Shandong, China, on Monday, 31 August 2015 and killed thirteen people.

Events
At 11:22pm on 31 August 2015, a chemical factory in the Dongyin-Lijin Binhai Economic and Technological Development Zone in eastern China exploded. The ensuing fire took five hours to bring under control. Chinese authorities detained 12 company employees and executives and 11 government officials. One person was reported to have been killed in the explosion, however the death toll later rose to 13 with 25 others injured. The blast came just three weeks after the Tianjin disaster which garnered significant media coverage.

See also

 2015 Tianjin explosions
 2014 Kunshan explosion
 1988 PEPCON disaster
 Largest artificial non-nuclear explosions
 List of accidents and disasters by death toll

References

2015 disasters in China
2015 industrial disasters
Chemical plant explosions
Explosions in 2015
Explosions in China
Industrial fires and explosions in China
History of Shandong
August 2015 events in China